The athletics competition at the 2007 Summer Universiade was held in the Main Stadium at Thammasat University in Bangkok, Thailand, between 9 August and 14 August 2007.

Medal summary

Men's events

Women's events

Medals table

Participating nations

 (1)
 (10)
 (1)
 (19)
 (5)
 (1)
 (1)
 (2)
 (26)
 (5)
 (1)
 (5)
 (5)
 (11)
 (2)
 (2)
 (20)
 (2)
 (1)
 (39)
 (12)
 (2)
 (1)
 (9)
 (5)
 (7)
 (10)
 (1)
 (16)
 (6)
 (4)
 (1)
 (27)
 (2)
 (16)
 (15)
 (1)
 (13)
 (20)
 (20)
 (20)
 (2)
 (6)
 (14)
 (5)
 (2)
 (2)
 (9)
 (10)
 (7)
 (28)
 (29)
 (17)
 (10)
 (1)
 (13)
 (8)
 (6)
 (13)
 (1)
 (3)
 (2)
 (16)
 (2)
 (11)
 (5)
 (1)
 (10)
 (1)
 (10)
 (2)
 (5)
 (6)
 (1)
 (4)
 (4)
 (7)
 (1)
 (2)
 (18)
 (10)
 (4)
 (3)
 (1)
 (12)
 (70)
 (1)
 (6)
 (11)
 (9)
 (7)
 (10)
 (24)
 (13)
 (18)
 (14)
 (2)
 (10)
 (58)
 (2)
 (11)
 (20)
 (29)
 (1)
 (5)
 (3)
 (1)

See also
2007 in athletics (track and field)

References

Results
Results, day 1 - official site (archived)
Results, day 2 - official site (archived)
Results, day 3 - official site (archived)
Results, day 4 - official site
Results, day 5 - official site (archived)
Results, day 6 - official site (archived)
Results – Day 1
Results – Day 2
Results – Day 3
Results – Day 4
Results – Day 5
Results – Day 6
World Student Games (Universiade - Men) - GBR Athletics
World Student Games (Universiade - Women) - GBR Athletics
Results
Finals results

Daily reports

 
2007 Summer Universiade
Universiade
Athletics at the Summer Universiade